Columbinia elegans is a left-handed, air-breathing land snail species in the genus Columbinia. It is found in Peru.

References

External links 

 Columbinia elegans at the Worldwide Mollusc Species Data Base (WMSDB)

Clausiliidae
Gastropods described in 2010
Fauna of Peru